Thomas Tait may refer to:

 Thomas S. Tait (1882–1954), Scottish Modernist architect
 Thomas James Tait (1864–1940), Canadian-born rail commissioner
 Thomas Tait (cricketer) (1872–1954), English county cricketer

See also
Tommy Tait (disambiguation)
Thomas Tate (disambiguation)